is a phenomenon in Spanish grammar, considered "wrong" in prescriptive works.

  (Grammatically normal, with a reflexive verb: "I am pleased...")
  (Prescriptively incorrect, non-reflexive , usually  "It pleases me...")

References

 Bentivoglio, Paola. 1975. "" In Frances M. Aid, Melvyn C. Resnick, and Bohdan Saciuk (eds.), Colloquium on Hispanic Linguistics (Washington: Georgetown University Press), pp. 1–18. .
 Carbonero, Pedro. 1992.
 Gomez Torrego, Leonardo. 1991. ""  , 55: 23-44.
 McLauchlan, Jessica, 1982. "" , 6 (1): 11-55.
 Rabanales, Ambrosio. 1974. Also in Juan M. Lope Blanch (ed.),  (Mexico City: , 1977), pp. 541–569.

Spanish grammar